Aki Thomas (born May 14, 1979) is an American college basketball coach. He served as the head men's basketball coach at the University of Maryland, Baltimore County (UMBC) from 2012 to 2016. He replaced Randy Monroe, who resigned just two days before the start of the 2012–13 season.

Biography

Playing career
Thomas played three seasons at the University of Colorado, where he was a part of two NIT squads for the Buffaloes. For his final season of eligibility, Thomas transferred to Howard University, where he was named to the MEAC Second Team All-Conference after averaging 12 points per game along with 8 rebounds a contest, helping the Bison to an 18–13 record.

After graduation, Thomas spent two years playing professionally in Venezuela.

Coaching career
After playing pro ball, Thomas joined the coaching staff at Howard in 2004 under Frankie Allen. In 2007, he joined the staff at UMBC, where he was a part of the Retrievers' 2008 America East Championship season and appearance in the 2008 NCAA tournament.

Just two days before the 2012–13 season, Thomas was named the acting head coach of UMBC after Randy Monroe was relieved of his duties. Thomas led the Retrievers to a 7–22 record and 8th-place finish in the America East Conference. The seven wins were the most for the program since the 2008–09 season. On March 4, 2013, the interim title was removed and Thomas was named the permanent head coach.

After four seasons and a 29–95 record, Thomas was fired by UMBC.

Head coaching record

References

1979 births
Living people
American expatriate basketball people in Venezuela
American men's basketball coaches
American men's basketball players
Basketball coaches from New York (state)
Basketball players from New York City
College men's basketball head coaches in the United States
Colorado Buffaloes men's basketball players
Howard Bison men's basketball coaches
Howard Bison men's basketball players
UMBC Retrievers men's basketball coaches